Amidostomatidae is a family of nematodes belonging to the order Strongylida.

Genera:
 Amidostomum Railliet & Henry, 1909
 Epomidiostomum Skrjabin, 1915

References

Nematodes